The Standing Committee on Education and Church Affairs is a standing committee of the Parliament of Norway. It is responsible for policies relating to education, research and church affairs. It corresponds to the Ministry of Education and Research and the church affairs section of the Ministry of Culture and Church Affairs. The committee has 15 members and is chaired by Trond Giske of the Labour Party.

Members 2013–2017

References

Standing committees of the Storting